Zaporizhzhia or Zaporozhye, until 1921 known as Aleksandrovsk or Oleksandrivsk, is a city in southeast Ukraine, situated on the banks of the Dnieper River. It is the administrative centre of Zaporizhzhia Oblast. Zaporizhzhia has a population of 

Zaporizhzhia is known for the historic island of Khortytsia, multiple power stations and for being an important industrial centre. Steel, aluminium, aircraft engines, automobiles, transformers for substations, and other heavy industrial goods are produced in the region.

Names and etymology
The name Zaporizhzhia refers to the position of the city: "beyond the rapids"—downstream or south of the Dnieper Rapids. These were previously an impediment to navigation and the site of important portages. In 1932, the rapids were flooded to become part of the reservoir of the Dnieper Hydroelectric Station. 

History

Zaporizhzhia was founded in 1770, when the Aleksandrovskaya Fortress was built as a part of the Dnieper Defence Line, to protect the southern territories of the Russian Empire from Crimean Tatar invasions. Following the Treaty of Küçük Kaynarca in 1775, the southern lands of the Russian Plain and the Crimean peninsula were absorbed into the Russian Empire. The Aleksandrovskaya Fortress then lost its military significance, and became a small rural town, which from 1806 to around 1930 was called  Alexandrovsk.

The opening of the Kichkas Bridge at the start of 20th century, the first rail crossing of the Dnieper, was followed the industrial growth of Zaporizhzhia . In 1916, during World War I, the  DEKA Stock Association transferred its aircraft engine manufacturing plant from Saint Petersburg to Zaporizhzhia.

During the Russian Civil War (19181921), Zaporizhzhia was the scene of fierce fighting between the Red Army and the White armies of Denikin and Wrangel, Petliura's Ukrainian People's Army of the Ukrainian People's Republic, and German-Austrian troops. The opposing armies used the strategically important Kichkas Bridge to transfer  troops, ammunition, and medical supplies. The Soviet government industrialized Zaporizhzhia still further during the 1920s and 1930s, when the Dnieper Hydroelectric Station, and the Zaporizhzhia Steel Plant, and the Dnieper Aluminium Plant were built. In the 1930s, the American United Engineering and Foundry Company built a strip mill similar to the Ford River Rouge steel mill to produce rolling steel strip.

World War II (1941–1945)

After the outbreak of the War between the USSR and Nazi Germany in June 1941, the Soviet government began evacuating Zaporizhzhia's industries to Siberia. and the Soviet security forces began shooting political prisoners in the city. On 18 August 1941, elements of the German 1st Panzergruppe reached the outskirts of Zaporizhzhia on the right bank and seized the island of Khortytsia.

The Red Army blew a  hole in the Dnieper hydroelectric dam on 18 August 1941, producing a flood wave that swept from Zaporizhzhia to Nikopol. The flood killed local residents as well as soldiers from both armies, with historians estimating the death toll to be between 20,000 and 100,000. Despite reinforcements, Zaporizhzhia was taken on 3 October 1941. The German occupation lasted two years; during which the Germans shot over 35,000 people and sent 58,000 people to Germany as forced labourers.

The Germans reformed Army Group South in February 1943, and put its headquarters in Zaporizhzhia. Adolf Hitler visited the headquarters in February1943, and again the following month, where he was briefed by Field Marshal Eric von Manstein and his air force counterpart Field Marshal Wolfram Freiherr von Richthofen, and in September 1943, the month the Army Group moved its headquarters to Kirovograd).

In August 1943, the Germans built the Panther-Wotan defence line along the Dnieper from Kyiv to Crimea. They retreated back to this line in September 1943, holding the city as a bridgehead over the Dnieper with elements of 40th Panzer and 17th Corps. The Soviet Southwestern Front, commanded by Army General Rodion Malinovsky, attacked Zaporizhzhia on 10 October 1943. The defenders repelled these attacks, but the Red Army launched a surprise night attack on 13 October, which succeeded in reclaiming most parts of the city.

1991–present

In 2004, to alleviate congestion around the Zaporizhzhia Arch Bridge area, construction began on the New Zaporizhzhia Dniper Bridge, although construction was halted soon after it began, due to a lack of funding.

During the 2014 Euromaidan regional state administration occupations, during protests against President Viktor Yanukovych, Zaporizhzhia's regional state administration building was occupied by 4,500 protesters, and there were clashes between Ukrainian and pro-Russian activists in April 2014. 

On 19 May 2016, the Verkhovna Rada approved the "Decommunisation Law". Since the introduction of the law, the city council renamed over 50 streets and administrative areas of the city, monuments of the Soviet Union leaders Lenin and Felix Dzerzhinsky have been destroyed, and names honouring Soviet leaders in the titles of industrial plants, factories, culture centres, and the DniproHES have been removed.

Russian invasion (2022)

Russian forces have been engaged in ongoing attacks on Zaporizhzhia since the beginning of the 2022 Russian invasion of Ukraine. On 27 February, fighting was reported in the southern outskirts, and Russian forces began shelling the city later that evening. On 3 March, Russian forces approached the Zaporizhzhia Nuclear Power Plant, raising concerns about a potential nuclear meltdown. Russian military forces fired missiles on Zaporizhzhia on the evening of 12/13 May.

On 30 September, hours before Russia formally annexed Southern and Eastern Ukraine, the Russian Armed Forces launched S-300 missiles at a civilian convoy in Zaporizhzhia, killing at least 30 people. On 9 October, Russian forces launched rockets at residential buildings, killing at least 17 people.

Geography
Zaporizhzhia is located in south-eastern Ukraine. The Dnieper splits the city in two; between them is Khortytsia Island. The island has  sizes.

The flora of Khortytsia is unique and diverse, due to the dry steppe air and a large freshwater basin, which cleans the air polluted by industry. The island is a national park. The ground surface is cut by large ravines (""), hiking routes and historical monuments. The island, which is a popular recreational area, has sanatoriums, resorts, health centres, and sandy beaches.

Climate

Governance

Zaporizhzhia is the main city of Zaporizhzhia Oblast with a form of self-rule within the oblast. The city is divided into 7 administrative raions.

Demographics

City population

The city population has been declining since the first years of the state independence. In 2014–2015 the rate of the population decrease was −0.56%/year.

In January 2017, the population was 750,685.
The total reduction of the population of the city since independence has been around 146,000 (not including 2017–2018).

Ethnic structure
According to the 2001 census, 70.28% of the population of Zaporizhzhia (total population 815,300) were Ukrainians, 25.39% were Russians, 0.67% were Belorussians, 0.44% were Bulgarians, 0.42% were Jews, 0.38% were Georgians, 0.38% were Armenians, 0.27% were Tatar, 0.15% were Azeris, 0.11%  were Roma (Gypsies), 0.1% were Poles, 0.09% were Germans, 0.09% were Moldovans, and 0.07% were Greeks.

Language

Ukrainian is used for official government business. The native language of people living in Zaporizhzhia, according to censuses in Ukraine (by percent):

Religion
The following religious denominations are present in Zaporizhzhia:

Christianity
Orthodoxy

Most of the citizens are Orthodox Christians of Ukrainian Orthodox Church (Moscow Patriarchate) or Orthodox Church of Ukraine. There are also St. Nicholas Church and St. Andrew's Cathedral in the city.

Protestantism
Protestantism is represented by:
All-Ukrainian Union of Christians of Evangelical Faith;
Seventh-day Adventist Church;
Full Gospel Church.

Catholicism
Catholicism is represented by:
Ukrainian Greek Catholic Church;
The Roman Catholic Church.
The biggest Catholic church is Church of God, the Father of Mercy

Judaism
Orthodox Judaism is represented by one union and six communities.

Islam
In the Zaporizhzhia district there are five communities which are part of the Spiritual Administration of Muslims of Ukraine and four independent Muslim communities.

Hinduism
The city hosts a branch of the Vedic Academy.

Economy

Industry

Zaporizhzhia is an important industrial centre of Ukraine, the country's main car manufacturing company, the Motor-Sich world-famous aircraft engine manufacturer. Well supplied with electricity, Zaporizhzhia forms, together with the adjoining Donets Basin (Donbas) and the Nikopol manganese and Kryvyi Rih iron mines, one of Ukraine's leading industrial complexes.

The city is a home of Ukraine's main automobile production centre, which is based at the Zaporizhzhia Automobile Factory (ZAZ), producing Ukrainian car brands such as Zaporozhets and Tavria.

After the end of the Russian Revolution, the city became an important industrial centre. The presence of cheap labor and the proximity of deposits of coal, iron ore, and manganese created favorable conditions for large-scale enterprises of the iron and mechanical engineering industries. Today Zaporizhzhia is an important industrial centre of the region with heavy industry (particularly metallurgy), aluminium, and chemical industry. Cars, avia motors and radioelectronics are manufactured in the city. The port of Zaporizhzhia is important for transshipment for goods from the Donbas.

Zaporizhstal, Ukraine's fourth largest steel maker, and ranking 54th in the world, is based in the city.

Electricity generation
Zaporizhzhia is a large electricity generating hub. There are hydroelectric power plant known as "DniproHES" Dnieper Hydroelectric Station and the largest nuclear power plant in Europe. Prior to the 2022 invasion, the plants generated about 25% of the Ukrainian electricity supply.

Culture

Zaporizhzhia has an orchestra, museums, theatres, and libraries. These include the Magara Academic Drama Theatre, the Municipal Theatre Lab "VIE", the Theatre for Young-Age spectators, the Theatre of Horse Riding "Zaporizhzhian Cossacks", the Zaporizhzhia Regional Museum, the National Museum of the History of the Zaporizhzhian Cossacks, the Zaporizhzhia Regional Art Museum, the Motor Sich Aviation Museum, and the Zaporizhzhia Region Universal Scientific Library.

There are a number of small amateur groups of folk music bands, art galleries in Zaporizhzhia. The city regularly holds festivals, Cossack martial arts competitions, and art exhibitions.

A daily exhibition of artists' organizations of the city is a unique place in Zaporizhzhia, where people can meet craftsmen and artists, watch carving, embroidery, beading classes, and receive advice from professional artists and designers.

Main sights

The historical and cultural museum "Zaporizka Sich" is placed on the northern rocky part of Khotritsa Island. The museum is a reconstruction of the stronghold of the Zaporizhzhian Cossacks, and contains features of the military camp life and their lifestyle.

Each of the smaller islands are located between the dam and the island Khortytsia has its own legend. On one of them,  ("Rock of the Fool"), Tzar Peter the Great flogged the Cossacks for their betrayal the Russians during the Great Northern War between Russia and Sweden. Another small island,  ("Pillar"), has a geological feature, which looks like a large bowl in granite slabs, the Cossack's Bowl. It is said that in summer days, water can be boiled in this "bowl", and the Cossacks used it for cooking  (boiled dough in a spicy broth).

Transport links
 
Zaporizhzhia is an important transportation hub in Ukraine that includes roads, as well as rail, river and air links for passenger and freight transport. Zaporizhzhia International Airport, located to the east of the city on the left-bank of the Dnieper, serves domestic and international flights. Shyroke Airfield is to the west of the city on the right-bank of the Dnieper.

Zaporizhzhia is bypassed beyond its eastern outskirts by a major national highway M18, which connects Kharkiv with Simferopol. The H08, which starts just outside Kyiv and travels southeast along the Dnieper through Kremenchuk, Kamianske, Dnipro, passes through Zaporizhzhia on to Mariupol.

There are four road bridges and two rail bridges over the Dnieper, nearly all of which bridges cross Khortytsia Island. President Volodymyr Zelenskyy opened the first stage of the New Zaporizhzhia Dniper Bridge early in 2022. 

The city has two rail stations, Zaporizhzhia-1 Railway Station and Zaporizhzhia-the-Second. The First is the central station, located in the southern part of the city and is a part of Simferopol-Kharkiv, the "north-south" transit route. The line of the Zaporizhzhia-the-Second station connects the Donbas coalfield with Kryvyi Rih. The city has an extensive tram network with 7 lines called the Zaporizhzhia Tram.

The city's two river ports are part of the national water transportation infrastructure that connects Kyiv to Kherson along the Dnieper. Freight ships and cutter boats travel between Zaporizhzhia and nearby villages.

Notable people

 Alyosha (born 1986), Ukrainian singer, stage name of Olena Oleksandrivna Kucher
 Vasiliy Bebko, (1932-2022), Russian diplomat
 Tamara Bulat (1933-2004), Ukrainian-American musicologist
 Victoria Bulitko (born 1983), a Ukrainian film, TV and theatre actress.
 Evgeniy Chernyak (born 1969), Ukrainian businessman
 Evgeniy Chuikov (1924-2000) Ukrainian landscape painter working in the Russian realist and French Impressionist traditions.
 Volodymyr Dakhno (1932-2006) Ukrainian animator and animation film director.
 Valentyna Danishevska (born 1957), Ukrainian lawyer and judge
 Gerhard Ens (1863–1952), farmer, immigration agent and politician in Saskatchewan
 Igor Fesunenko (1933-2016), Russian journalist and foreign affairs writer
 Sergey Glazyev (born 1961), Russian politician and economist
 Alina Gorlova (born 1992), a Ukrainian filmmaker, director, and screenwriter
 Konstantin Grigorishin (born 1965), a Russian-Ukrainian businessman and billionaire.
 Volodymyr Horbulin (born 1939), Ukrainian politician
 Valeriy Ivaschenko (born 1956), Ukrainian former Deputy Minister of Defence
 Boris Ivchenko, (1941-1990) Ukrainian actor and film director
 Igor P. Kaidashev (born 1969), Ukrainian immunologist and allergist
 Valeriy Kostyuk (born 1940), Russian scientist
 Maxim Ksenzov (born 1973), Russian statesman
 Valery Kulikov (born 1956), Ukrainian-born Russian politician
 Gosha Kutsenko (born 1967), Russian actor, producer, singer, poet and screenwriter
 Valentyn Nalyvaichenko (born 1966), Ukrainian diplomat and politician. 
 Eva Neymann (born 1974), Ukrainian film director
 Maria Nikiforova (1885–1919), revolutionary insurgent and Anarchist partisan leader.
 Anna October (born 1991), Ukrainian fashion designer
 Aleksandr Panayotov (born 1984), Russian-Ukrainian singer and songwriter
 Mykhailo Papiyev (born 1960), Ukrainian engineer and politician
 Oleksandr Peklushenko, (1954-2015) Ukrainian politician
 Max Polyakov (born 1977), an international technology entrepreneur, economist and philanthropist
 Georgy Shchokin (born 1954), businessman, sociologist, psychologist and politician
 Boris Shtein, (1892–1961) Soviet diplomat
 Oleksandr Sin (born 1961), Ukrainian politician former mayor of Zaporizhzhia
 Serhiy Sobolyev (born 1961), Ukrainian politician
 Yanina Sokolova (born 1984) a journalist, TV presenter and actress.
 Naum Sorkin, (1899–1980) a Soviet military officer and diplomat.
 Oleksandr Starukh (born 1973), Ukrainian historian and politician
 Liudmyla Suprun (born 1965), a Ukrainian politician
 Yevhen Synelnykov (born 1981), a Ukrainian TV presenter, director and actor
 Estas Tonne (born 1975), a musician, plays guitar and flute
 Vladyslav Yama (born 1982), a Ukrainian dancer and educator

Sport 

 Polina Astakhova (1936–2005) an artistic gymnast; won ten medals at the 1956, 1960 and 1964 Summer Olympics.
 Anastasia Bliznyuk (born 1994), a Russian group rhythmic gymnast.
 Maksym Dolhov (born 1996), Ukrainian diver
 Yan Kovalevskyi (born 1993), Ukrainian footballer
 Tanja Logwin (born 1974), Ukrainian-born Austrian handball player
 Alina Maksymenko (born 1991), Ukrainian rhythmic gymnast
 Oleksii Pashkov (born 1981), silver medallist in the discus at the 2012 Summer Paralympics 
 Volodymyr Polikarpenko (born 1972), Ukrainian former trialthon athlete
 Yakiv Punkin (1921–1994) wrestler, gold medallist at the 1952 Summer Olympics. 
 Oksana Skaldina (born 1972) gymnast; bronze medallist at the 1992 Summer Olympics 
 Ganna Sorokina (born 1976) diver; team bronze medallist at the 2000 Summer Olympics
 Olga Strazheva (born 1972) gymnast; team gold medallist at the 1988 Summer Olympics
 Vita Styopina (born 1976) high jumper; bronze medallist at the 2004 Summer Olympics
 Denys Sylantyev (born 1976) politician and swimmer; four time Olympian, silver medallist at the 2000 Summer Olympics and national flag bearer at the 2004 Summer Olympics.
 Razmik Tonoyan (born 1988), Ukrainian sambist, (a Soviet-origin Russian martial art)
 Roman Volod'kov (born 1973), Ukrainian former diver
 Sergiusz Wołczaniecki (born 1964) a Polish weightlifter; bronze medallist at the 1992 Summer Olympics
 Olena Zhupina (born 1973), Ukrainian diver

In popular culture
Zaporizhzhia is a setting in two Axis victory in World War II short novels by the American author Harry Turtledove, Ready for the Fatherland (1991) and The Phantom Tolbukhin (1998).

Twin towns – sister cities

Zaporizhzhia is twinned with:

 Lahti, Finland (1953)
 Belfort, France (1967)
 Birmingham, United Kingdom (1973)
 Linz, Austria (1983)
 Oberhausen, Germany (1986)
 Yichang, China (1997)
 Magdeburg, Germany (2008)
 Ashdod, Israel (2011)

In 1969, the city renamed one of its streets after the city of Wrocław. The Wrocław authorities reciprocated, and a part of the SudeckaGrabiszyńska Street towards the Square of the Silesian Insurgents was renamed Zaporoska Street.

See also
Zaporizhzhia Ferroalloy Plant
Zaporizhzhia Foundry and Mechanical Plant

Notes

References

Sources
Е. М. Поспелов (Ye. M. Pospelov). "Имена городов: вчера и сегодня (1917–1992). Топонимический словарь." (City Names: Yesterday and Today (1917–1992). Toponymic Dictionary." Москва, "Русские словари", 1993.

External links

Official portal of Zaporizhzhia City 
One of the portals of Zaporizhzhia City 
Another one of the portals of Zaporizhzhia City 
Zaporizhzhia seven ways to adventure
One of the few external reports on the city in English is the BBC report "Ukraine: Why the Orange Revolution ran out of steam", Daniel Sandford, Moscow correspondent, BBC News 10 March 2011.

 
Alexandrovsky Uyezd (Yekaterinoslav Governorate)
Populated places established in 1770
Cities of regional significance in Ukraine
1770 establishments in Ukraine
Populated places established in the Russian Empire
1770 establishments in the Russian Empire
Populated places on the Dnieper in Ukraine
Oblast centers in Ukraine